Eudesmia quadrifasciata is a moth of the subfamily Arctiinae first described by Francis Walker in 1865. It is found in Mexico.

References

Eudesmia
Moths described in 1865